"Friends" is a song by German group Scooter, released in May 1995 as the third single from their debut album, ... and the Beat Goes On! (1995). The song is notable as the first example of the band using high pitched female vocals for the chorus of a song. The band also used this on the follow-up single "Endless Summer" before abandoning it until "Posse (I Need You on the Floor)" in 2001, after which it became a staple of most Scooter singles.

The song was covered in 2009 by Klostertaler, for a Scooter tribute album. In April 2011, an updated version of the original, entitled "Friends Turbo", was released as the theme to the German release of the film New Kids Turbo.

Critical reception
Pan-European magazine Music & Media wrote, "It seems like they have the exclusive rights to "novelty." After nonsensical "Hyper Hyper" and "Move Your Ass", you would swear that Daffy Duck has been asked to do the lead vocals."

Music video
The accompanying music video for "Friends" was directed by Eric Will and filmed in Paris. It had generated more than 14 million views on YouTube as of December 2022. Will had previously directed the video for "Move Your Ass!". 

The video for the release of "Friends Turbo" was filmed on location in Maaskantje.

Track listings

 CD maxi - Germany (CLU 6123-5)
 "Friends" (4:40)
 "Friends" (Single edit) (3:47)
 "Friends" (Ramon Zenker club remix) (5:32)
 "Friends" (Jeyenne remix) (4:30)

 12" maxi - Germany
 "Friends" (4:40)
 "Friends" (Ramon Zenker club remix) (5:32)
 "Friends" (Jeyenne remix) (4:30)

 CD maxi - Australia
 "Friends" (Single edit) (3:47)
 "Friends" (Ramon Zenker club remix) (5:32)
 "Endless Summer" (Datura remix) (4:50)
 "Hyper Hyper" (Video edit) (3:34)
 "Move Your Ass!" (Platinum People remix) (7:46)
 "Friends" (4:40)

 CD maxi - France
 "Friends" (Single edit) (3:47)
 "Friends" (Extended) (4:40)
 "Friends" (Ramon Zenker club remix) (5:32)
 "Friends" (Jeyenne remix) (4:30)

 CD single - France
 "Friends" (Single edit) (3:47)
 "Friends" (Ramon Zenker club remix) (5:32)

 12" maxi - France
 "Friends" (Extended) (4:40)
 "Friends" (Single) (3:47)
 "Friends" (Ramon Zenker club remix) (5:32)
 "Friends" (Jeyenne remix) (4:30)

 12" maxi - Spain
 "Friends" (Extended) (4:40)
 "Friends" (Single) (3:47)
 "Friends" (Ramon Zenker club remix) (5:32)
 "Move Your Ass!" (Original mix) (5:50)

Charts

Weekly charts

 *: In the UK, this song was part of the Move Your Ass EP.

Year-end charts

Certifications

References

1995 singles
1995 songs
Music videos directed by Eric Will
Scooter (band) songs
Songs written by H.P. Baxxter
Songs written by Jens Thele
Songs written by Rick J. Jordan